Frideborg Winblad (January 18, 1869 – November 30, 1964) was an elementary school teacher in Härnösand, Sweden, who went on to become Sweden's first female educational administrator.

Early life
Frideborg was the daughter of Anton Julius Winblad I (1828–1901), the church organist and the first schoolteacher of Ytterlännäs, Sweden; and Elsa Maria Elisabeth Näslund (1829-1907). Elsa's father was the vicar of Ytterlännäs. Frideborg was born in Anundsjö, Västernorrland, Sweden.

Her siblings include: Johan Edward Winblad (1856-1914) who was a ship's mate that emigrated to Norway and married Salmine Sophia Severine Pedersen (1862-1914) then emigrated to the United States; Karl Israel Winblad (1857-?); Johanna Winblad (1859-1916) who married Per Olof Bernhard Wahlberg (1852-1927) a school teacher and church organist; Anton Teodor Winblad (1862-?); and Maria Elisabeth Winblad (1865-1937) who married Jonas Kempe (1861-1918). She also had a half sister: Antonette Kristina Winblad (1854-?) from the marriage of her father to Margareta Kristina Höglund I (1819-1853) aka Greta Stina Höglund, who died during childbirth.

Teacher
Frideborg graduated from the Teacher's School in Umeå in 1896 at age 27. By 1890 she was living in the "prestbolet" with her parents, and working alongside her father. She moved to Härnösand on October 5, 1896, and lived at #137, 8th quarter in the city. In 1900 she was still living in Härnösand by herself and was working as a "lärarinna". She never married or had children. Her father died in 1901 and her mother in 1907, after which she became the director of a seminary training college in Härnösand. She retired in 1929. In 1939 a scholarship was created in her name.

Death
Frideborg died on November 30, 1964 at the Fristad Nursing Home, Härnösand, Sweden. She was buried in Anundsjö, Västernorrland län, with her parents. An obituary in Västernorrlands Allehanda on December 2, 1964, translated from Swedish, noted that: "The former local principal Miss Frideborg Winblad, Härnösand, died on Monday at the nursing home Fristad, where she resided her last years. She was 95 years old. Frideborg Winblad was one of the country’s notable women in the area of elementary school education.  When government authorities in her time set into motion an investigation on better developmental possibilities for teacher education and preparation of proposals for new teaching plans, Miss Winblad was called to participate on the work as the only female member of the committee.  She was even vice chairman of the board of directors for the elementary school teacher’s association for a long succession of years. Frideborg Winblad was born in Bredbyn, where her father was cantor.  After graduation from the elementary school teacher program in Umeå in 1896, she came to the elementary school in Härnösand as a teacher and in 1907 became head of the school.  This post she held until 1929, when she retired.  Through her friendly nature she won the affection of her colleagues, students and friends, whose gratitude was expressed in the collection of a scholarship fund in her name, which was made on her 70th birthday. She is mourned by her nieces/nephews and their families."

References

1869 births
1964 deaths
People from Örnsköldsvik Municipality
Swedish educators